The 1939 Tulane Green Wave football team represented Tulane University as a member of the Southeastern Conference (SEC) during the 1939 college football season. Led by fourth-year head coach Red Dawson, the Green Wave played their home games at Tulane Stadium in New Orleans. Tulane finished the season with an overall record of 8–1–1 and a mark of 5–0 in conference play, sharing the SEC title with the Tennessee and Georgia Tech. Tulane  was invited to the Sugar Bowl, where they lost to Texas A&M.

Schedule

References

Tulane
Tulane Green Wave football seasons
Southeastern Conference football champion seasons
Tulane Green Wave football